"Who's on First?" is a comedy routine made famous by American comedy duo Abbott and Costello. The premise of the sketch is that Abbott is identifying the players on a baseball team for Costello. However, the players' names can simultaneously serve as the basis for questions (e.g., "Who is the first baseman?") and responses (e.g., "The first baseman's name is Who."), leading to repeated misinterpretations and growing frustration between the performers.

History
"Who's on First?" is descended from turn-of-the-century burlesque sketches that used plays on words and names. Examples are "The Baker Scene" (the shop is located on Watt Street) and "Who Dyed" (the owner is named "Who"). In the 1930 movie Cracked Nuts, comedians Bert Wheeler and Robert Woolsey examine a map of a mythical kingdom with dialogue like this: "What is next to Which." "What is the name of the town next to Which?" "Yes." In British music halls, comedian Will Hay performed a routine in the early 1930s (and possibly earlier) as a schoolmaster interviewing a schoolboy named Howe, who came from Ware, but now lives in Wye. By the early 1930s, a "Baseball Routine" had become a standard bit for burlesque comics across the United States. Abbott's wife recalled him performing the routine with another comedian before teaming with Costello.

Bud Abbott stated that it was taken from an older routine called "Who's The Boss?", a performance of which can be heard in an episode of the radio comedy program It Pays to Be Ignorant from the 1940s. After they formally teamed up in burlesque in 1936, he and Costello continued to hone the sketch. It was a big hit in the fall of 1937, when they performed the routine in a touring vaudeville revue called Hollywood Bandwagon.

In February 1938, Abbott and Costello joined the cast of The Kate Smith Hour radio program and the sketch was first performed for a national radio audience on March 24 of that year. The routine may have been further polished before this broadcast by burlesque producer John Grant, who became the team's writer and Will Glickman, a staff writer on the radio show. Glickman may have added the nicknames of then-contemporary baseball players like Dizzy and Daffy Dean to set up the routine's premise. This version, with extensive wordplay based on the fact that most of the fictional baseball team's players had "strange nicknames" that seemed to be questions, became known as "Who's on First?" Some versions continue with references to Enos Slaughter, which Costello misunderstands as "He knows" Slaughter. By 1944, Abbott and Costello had the routine copyrighted.

Abbott and Costello performed "Who's on First?" numerous times in their careers, rarely performing it exactly the same way twice. They did the routine for President Franklin Roosevelt several times. An abridged version was featured in the team's 1940 film debut, One Night in the Tropics. The duo reprised the bit in their 1945 film The Naughty Nineties and it is that longer version which is considered their finest recorded rendition. They also performed "Who's on First?" numerous times on radio and television (notably in The Abbott and Costello Show episode "The Actor's Home", widely considered the definitive version).

In 1956, a gold record of "Who's on First?" was placed in the National Baseball Hall of Fame and Museum in Cooperstown, New York. A video (taken from The Naughty Nineties) now plays continuously on screens at the Hall.

In the 1970s, Selchow and Righter published a "Who's on First?" board game.

In 1999, Time named the routine Best Comedy Sketch of the 20th Century.

An early radio recording from October 6, 1938, was placed in the Library of Congress's National Recording Registry in 2003.

In 2005, the line "Who's on First?" was included on the American Film Institute's list of 100 memorable movie quotations.

Sketch
The names given in the routine for the players at each position are:

The name of the shortstop is not given until the very end of the routine and the right fielder is never identified. In the Selchow and Righter board game, the right fielder's name is "Nobody".

At one point in the routine, Costello thinks that the first baseman is named "Naturally":

Abbott's explanations leave Costello hopelessly confused and infuriated, until the end of the routine when Costello appears to parody Abbott by saying what appears to be gibberish to him, accidentally getting it right:

That is the most commonly heard ending. "I Don't Care" and "I Don't Give a Damn" have also turned up on occasion, depending on the perceived sensibilities of the audience. (The performance in the film The Naughty Nineties ends with "I Don't Care.")

The skit was usually performed on the team's radio series at the start of the baseball season. In one instance it serves as a climax for a broadcast which begins with Costello receiving a telegram from Joe DiMaggio asking Costello to take over for him due to his injury. (In this case, the unidentified right fielder would have been Costello himself. While Joe DiMaggio was best known as a center fielder, when Abbott and Costello honed the sketch in 1936–37, Joe DiMaggio had played a number of games at right field (20 in 1936).)

Writing credit
Writing credits for the sketch are unknown though, over the years, numerous people have claimed or been given credit for it. Such claims typically lack reasonable corroboration. For example, a 1993 obituary of comedy sketch writer Michael J. Musto states that, shortly after Abbott and Costello teamed up, they paid Musto $15 to write the script. Furthermore, several 1996 obituaries of songwriter Irving Gordon mention that he had written the sketch.

Copyright infringement case
In 2015, the heirs of Abbott and Costello filed a federal copyright infringement lawsuit in the Southern District of New York claiming unauthorized use of over a minute of the comedy routine in the play Hand to God. The lawsuit was filed against the playwright Robert Askins, the producers and the promoters. The defense claimed that the underlying "Who's on First?" routine was in the public domain because the original authors, Abbott and Costello, were not the ones who filed a copyright renewal, but the court did not see the need to make a final determination on that. The court ruled against the heirs, saying that the use by the play was transformative fair use. The heirs appealed, eventually to the US Supreme Court, which, in 2017, declined to review the case.

Derivatives and references in popular culture
The sketch has been reprised, updated, alluded to and parodied many times over the decades in all forms of media. Some examples include:

 The comedy troupe The Credibility Gap (1968–1979) did a rock group variation on this routine involving a promoter, played by Harry Shearer and a newspaper advertising salesman, played by David L. Lander, confusing the night's acts as proper nouns. The acts were The Who, The Guess Who and Yes.
 Eugene Levy and Tony Rosato performed a variation on this theme on the TV series SCTV (1976–1984), with the rock groups The Band, The Who and Yes. The final punchline changed to "This is for the birds (The Byrds)!" "Ah, they broke up long ago!"
 Episode six of the fourth season of WKRP in Cincinnati (1981) is entitled "Who's on First?". It revolves around Mr. Carlson being mistaken for Herb Tarlek, and to "prove Andy wrong" Les Nessman is then convinced to act as Mr. Carlson. When a thug named Dave shows up to confront Johnny about an unpaid gambling debt, Johnny Fever claims Andy Travis' identity, while Mr. Carlson refers to Andy as "Johnny" ... with painful consequences for Andy.
 The biography of Lou Costello written by his daughter Chris is titled Lou's on First (1982).
 In the mid-1980s, Johnny Carson's spoof of then-president Ronald Reagan preparing for a press briefing included "Hu is on the phone", a reference to fictional Chinese leader Chung Dong Hu. Reagan also misunderstands references to Secretary of the Interior James Watt (misheard as "what") and PLO leader Yassir Arafat (misheard as "Yes sir").
 In the 1988 film Rain Man, the film's titular character, played by Dustin Hoffman, stims by reciting the skit to himself whenever his brother Charlie, played by Tom Cruise, makes him anxious by meddling with his personal effects.
 In the Animaniacs segment "Woodstock Slappy" (1994), Slappy and Skippy Squirrel attend the 1969 Woodstock Festival, where they pay homage to the routine. Similar to the SCTV version, Slappy confuses The Who, The Band and Yes for proper nouns.
 In the Invasion of the Neptune Men episode of Mystery Science Theater 3000 in 1998, during one host segment, Mike and the 'Bots put on a Who's on First-themed skit concerning Japanese Noh Theater.
 Mad Magazine's February 1999 issue featured an article (written by Desmond Devlin and illustrated by Mort Drucker) of Abbott and Costello trying to organize MTV's music video library, with Costello getting confused by the names of songs such as "Give Me One Reason", "You Oughta Know", "Ironic", "What You Want", "I Still Haven't Found What I'm Looking For", "Don't Speak", "If It Makes You Happy", "Stop" and "Quit Playing Games". The names of bands U2 and No Doubt also cause confusion.
 In The Simpsons episode "Marge Simpson in: 'Screaming Yellow Honkers', (1999) Superintendent Chalmers and Principal Skinner attempt to perform the routine, but Chalmers gives up after Skinner explains the joke with his first line: "Not the pronoun, but rather a player with the unlikely name of "Who" is on first."
 In 2002, playwright Jim Sherman wrote a variation called "Hu's on First" featuring George W. Bush being confused when Condoleezza Rice tells him that the new leader of China is named Hu, pronounced similarly to the word "Who". Bush also misunderstands Rice's references to Yassir Arafat ("yes, sir") and Kofi Annan ("coffee").
In the Get Fuzzy comic for September 12, 2005, an injured Rob asks Satchel to use speed dial to call "Dr Watt", who is second on the speed dial list after Dr. Hu. Satchel gleefully replies "Third Base!", much to Rob's annoyance.
 In the 2007 film Rush Hour 3, LAPD Detective James Carter (Chris Tucker) visits a Kung Fu studio where he meets Master Yu and an instructor named Mi. Carter, Yu and Mi engage in a comedic back and forth in which they confuse the names Yu and Mi with the words "you" and "me".
 In 2007, Canadian Internet comedy group LoadingReadyRun released a parody called It's Very Simple.
 Late Night with Jimmy Fallon, in December 2012, featured a variation of the routine called "Who's on First?: The Sequel". Depicted with vintage touches (black and white images, retro costumes, etc.), the skit finds host Jimmy Fallon in the Bud Abbott role and announcer Steve Higgins as Lou Costello. The twist here is that "Who", "What" and "I Don't Know" actually join in on the quick repartee, with the players respectively played by Billy Crystal, Late Night head writer A. D. Miles and Jerry Seinfeld.
 The October 19, 2014, strip of the comic Pearls Before Swine sees Rat ask Goat "Whose drummer was Keith Moon?" Goat responds that he is correct, although Rat does not understand that Goat is telling him Moon was the drummer for The Who. It leads to a routine of more confusions, including Charlie Watts of The Rolling Stones, Bob Weir of the Grateful Dead, Steve Howe of Yes and Pete Townshend – also of The Who. Thinking Goat is asking what band Townshend is the guitarist for, an exasperated Rat screams "I don't know!" Goat replies "Third base!" The final panel sees the still-exasperated Rat threatening to hit the comic's author Stephan Pastis with a baseball bat, asking "When would you like this hit?". Pastis responds "Winwood's the guitarist for Traffic."
 In 2017, Studio C made a spin-off of this as a sketch in their seventh season, titled Detective Doctor, At Your Service, where several characters have names such as Detective Doctor, Doctor Hisbrother and Officer Wounded, making the scene of an attempted murder much more confusing to deal with.
 In season 11 of All That (2019), the "Good Burger" sketch used the routine, in which Kel Mitchell's character Ed became confused when musical guest H.E.R. walked in to place an order after she told him who she was.

 A variant of unknown origin, called "Abbot and Costello do Hebrew", is popular in the Jewish American community. Its humor draws from the homophonic similarity of a number of words in English – hu, he, me, ma and dag are homophones of the Hebrew words for he, she, who, what and fish respectively.
 The skit is an easter egg on Google Assistant, Siri, Amazon Alexa and Bixby. Asking Google Assistant "OK Google, Who's on first?" will lead to the response "Yes, he is." or "Exactly." Siri responds "Correct. Who is on first." Alexa responds "That's what I keep telling you. Who's on first, What's on second." Bixby responds "I think Who gets the ball and throws it to What."
 There are several American restaurants named "Who's on First", located on 1st Street or 1st Avenue of their respective cities, including New York City, Waconia, MN  and Snohomish, WA

Real-life parallels
 On October 3, 1920, Allie Watt played one game at second base for the Washington Senators so that, for a brief time, "Watt's on second".
During a May 31, 1966, game against the Minnesota Twins, Eddie Watt of the Baltimore Orioles led off the 5th inning with a double, again creating a "Watt's on second" situation.
In September 2007, Los Angeles Dodgers shortstop Chin-Lung Hu, a late-season callup from Albuquerque, got his first major league hit against the Arizona Diamondbacks, a single; Dodgers announcer Vin Scully said "Shades of Abbott and Costello, I can finally say, 'Hu is on first base.

See also

 Curse of knowledge
 Propositional attitude
 Four Candles, a sketch from the British sketch comedy program The Two Ronnies with a similar premise involving misinterpreted phrases.
 "A Shakespearean Baseball Game", a Wayne and Shuster sketch first performed in 1958

Notes

References

External links
 Transcript and recording of "Who's on First?" on Baseball Almanac – accessed 2008-08-28
 
 The Abbott & Costello Radio Show - Who's on First? (Youtube)
 The Abbott & Costello (radio) Show - Who's on First?

Baseball culture
Comedy sketches
English phrases
Comedy catchphrases
Quotations from radio
Quotations from film
Sports fiction
United States National Recording Registry recordings
1930s neologisms